Samarakoon Mudiyanselage Chandrasena (born May 3, 1955) is a Sri Lankan politician, a member of the Parliament of Sri Lanka and a government minister. He has one child. His brother is former chief minister of North Central province, S. M. Ranjith. He is a famous politician in Anuradhapura District.

References
 

1955 births
Living people
Members of the 12th Parliament of Sri Lanka
Members of the 13th Parliament of Sri Lanka
Members of the 14th Parliament of Sri Lanka
Members of the 15th Parliament of Sri Lanka
Members of the 16th Parliament of Sri Lanka
Government ministers of Sri Lanka
Sri Lanka Freedom Party politicians
United People's Freedom Alliance politicians
People from Anuradhapura